The quarterfinals were two-legged ties determined on aggregate score. The first legs was played on March 23. All return legs were played on March 30. The group winner in each tie, listed as "Team #1", hosted the second leg.

Game 1

Game 2

External links
Schedule

Quarterfinals